Minarii Chantal Galenon (born 1956) is an educator, politician and women's rights activist from French Polynesia. She has been an elected member of the French Polynesian Assembly since 2008 and is President of the French Polynesian Women's Council.

Biography 
Galenon was born on Tahiti and grew up in Patutoa in Papeete. A former primary school teacher, from 2001 to 2008 Galenon served on Papeete Municipal Council. From 2008 she was an elected member of the French Polynesian Assembly representing the a Union for Democracy (UPLD) party. She was previously a supporter of Tahoeraa Huiraatira, but resigned from the party in December 2009. Her resignation meant she stood as an independent candidate, an action that meant that Gaston Tong Sang lost his majority. In 2011 hers was the casting vote in the no confidence motion that ended the presidency of Tong Sang.

In 2014 she joined the board of Pu o te Hau - the only women's shelter in the territory. In 2018 she spoke out against the cover designed for the brochure of the Tifaifai International Festival, which featured a naked Polynesian woman. Galenon was quoted as saying: "Nous souhaitons que l’image de la femme polynésienne soit basée sur des valeurs… Non plus considérée comme un objet d’exposition ! Il faut arrêter ce cliché." ["We want the image of Polynesian women to be based on values… No longer considered as an object of exhibition!"] She is President of the French Polynesian Women’s Council. She is also President of the Association Vahine Piri Rava. The organisation works to protect and develop women's rights in the territory, especially in terms of health.

In 2021 Galenon appealed to the United Nations General Assembly on behalf of the people of French Polynesia whose health has been affected by nuclear testing undertaken by the French government between the 1960s and the 1990s. The same year she voted in favour of a compulsory vaccination programme for certain occupations in response to the COVID-19 pandemic.

References 

French Polynesian politicians
Living people
1956 births
French Polynesian women in politics
Tavini Huiraatira politicians
Members of the Assembly of French Polynesia